This timeline of events preceding World War II covers the events of the interwar period (1918–1939) after World War I that affected or led to World War II.

1910s: 191019181919
1920s: 192019211922 1923192419251926 192719281929 
1930s: 193019311932 1933193419351936 193719381939 

Leaders of major participating countries

1910
August 22–29
Japan annexes Korea, paving the way for the invasion of Manchuria in 1931.

1918
October 28–31
 The Aster Revolution occurs establishing the First Hungarian Republic.

October 29
 Start of the German Revolution.

November 11
 The Armistice with Germany marks the end of World War I. German troops evacuate occupied territories and Allied troops subsequently move in and occupy the German Rhineland.

November 13
 The Hungarian–Romanian War begins.

December 27
 Start of the Greater Poland Uprising against German rule.

1919
January 4–15
The Spartacist uprising takes place and is crushed by the German government.
January 18
Opening of the Paris Peace Conference to negotiate peace treaties between the belligerents of World War I.
January 31
Battle of George Square takes place in Glasgow, the British Army is called in by the city authorities to quell a riot during a strike for a 40 hour work week.

February
The Polish–Soviet War begins with border clashes between the two states.
March 2
Foundation of the Third International, or Comintern in Moscow. Comintern's stated aim is to create a global Soviet republic.
March 12
The Austrian Constituent National Assembly demands Austria's integration to Germany.
March 21
Proclamation of the communist Hungarian Soviet Republic. 
May 15
The Turkish War of Independence begins as Greek troops land in Smyrna.
June 21
 A majority of the German fleet is scuttled at Scapa Flow in Scotland. The ships had been interned there under the terms of the 1918 Armistice while negotiations were occurring over ship's fates. The Germans feared that either the British would seize the ships or Germany would reject the Versailles Treaty and resume the war effort altogether with the ships likely being used against Germany in this case. 
June 28
Germany and the Allied powers sign the Treaty of Versailles after six months of negotiations. The German armed forces are limited in size to 100,000 personnel and Germany is ordered to pay large reparations for war damages. The United States signed the treaty but did not ratify it, later making a separate peace treaty with Germany.
July
An unknown corporal named Adolf Hitler infiltrates the German Workers' Party (the precursor of the Nazi Party) at the behest of the German Reichswehr.
August 1
Fall of the short-lived Hungarian Soviet Republic. The Hungarian People's Republic is reestablished.
August 3
 The Hungarian–Romanian War ends.
August 8
 The Hungarian People's Republic is dissolved.
September 10
German-Austria signs the Treaty of Saint-Germain. The peace treaty with the Allies regulates the borders of Austria, forbids union with Germany, and requires German-Austria to change its name to Austria. The United States did not ratify the treaty and later makes a separate peace treaty with Austria.
September 12
 Gabriele D'Annunzio leads a force of Italian nationalist irregulars in the seizure of the disputed city of Fiume (Rijeka).
November 27
Bulgaria signs the Treaty of Neuilly-sur-Seine. The peace treaty with the Allies regulates the borders of Bulgaria, the Bulgarian army is reduced to 20,000 men and Bulgaria is ordered to pay war reparations.

1920
January 21
The Paris Peace Conference comes to an end with the inaugural General Assembly of the League of Nations. Although one of the victors of World War I, the United States never joins the League.
March

The failed right-wing Kapp Putsch takes place against the German government. The German military remains passive and the putsch is defeated by a general strike.
The German Ruhr Uprising, spurred by the general strike against the Kapp Putsch, is crushed by the German military

June 4
Hungary signs the Treaty of Trianon with the Allied powers. The treaty regulated the status of an independent Hungarian state and defined its borders. The United States did not ratify the treaty and later makes a separate peace treaty with Hungary.

August 10
Turkey signs the Treaty of Sèvres with the Allied powers (except the US, which never declared war on Turkey). The treaty partitions the Ottoman Empire and the Turkish armed forces are reduced in size. Greece did not accept the borders as drawn up in the treaty and did not sign it. The Treaty of Sèvres was annulled in the course of the Turkish War of Independence and the parties signed and ratified the superseding Treaty of Lausanne in 1923.

October
Żeligowski's Mutiny, a Polish force led by General Lucjan Żeligowski, capture Vilnius, officially without support from the Polish state.

November 2
Franklin D. Roosevelt is defeated for the office of Vice President of the United States by Massachusetts Governor Calvin Coolidge.

November 15
The Free City of Danzig is established in accordance with the Treaty of Versailles, as a contentious compromise between the generally nationalist German majority in the city, and Poland's right to free and secure access to the sea.

December 24
 Bloody Christmas: Italy occupies Fiume after five days of resistance from Gabriele D'Annunzio's legionnaires.

1921
March 4
Warren G. Harding is inaugurated as President of the United States.
March 7–17
Red Army mutineers and Russian civilians seize the strategic city of Kronstadt in the Kronstadt Rebellion, demanding expanded civilian rights and an end to the Bolshevik monopoly on Soviet politics. After several days and several thousand casualties, the rebellion is crushed by Bolshevik forces from neighboring Petrograd.

March 18
The Polish–Soviet War ends with the Peace of Riga.
April 24
The Fiuman electorate approves the idea of a Free State of Fiume.
August 25
The U.S.–German Peace Treaty and the U.S.–Austrian Peace Treaty are signed, marking the formal end of the state of war between the two states and the United States instead of the Treaty of Versailles and the Treaty of Saint-Germain that were not ratified by the United States.
August 29
The U.S.–Hungarian Peace Treaty is signed, marking the formal end of the state of war between the two states instead of the Treaty of Trianon that was not ratified by the United States.
November 9
Foundation of the Italian National Fascist Party by Benito Mussolini during the Third Fascist Congress in Rome.

1922
February 6
The Washington Naval Conference ends with the signing of the Washington Naval Treaty by the United Kingdom, the United States, Japan, France, and Italy. The signing parties agree to limit the size of their naval forces.
March
The first German officers travel to the Soviet Union for the purposes of military cooperation between Germany and the Soviet Union.
April 16
Germany and the Soviet Union sign the Treaty of Rapallo, re-establishing diplomatic relations, renouncing financial claims on each other, and pledging future economic cooperation.
October
The Russian Civil War (ongoing since 7 November 1917) ends in Bolshevik victory with the defeat of the last White forces in Siberia.
October 11
Armistice of Mudanya is signed in the Turkish War of Independence.
October 29
Fascist leader Benito Mussolini is appointed prime minister of Italy by king Victor Emmanuel III after the March on Rome.
November 1
The Grand National Assembly of Turkey abolishes the Ottoman Sultanate.

1923
The Nationalist Kuomintang party and the Chinese Communist Party form the First United Front to end warlordism in China.
January 11
France and Belgium occupy the Ruhr in an effort to compel Germany to step up its payments of war reparations.
June
In the great inflation of 1923, the value of the German mark is destroyed. 
July 24
 The Treaty of Lausanne, settling the boundaries of modern Turkey, is signed in Switzerland by Turkey and the Entente powers. It marks the end of the Turkish War of Independence and replaces the earlier Treaty of Sèvres.
August 2
Warren G. Harding, President of the United States dies in office and is succeeded by his Vice President, Calvin Coolidge.
August 31
The Corfu incident: Italy bombards and occupies the Greek island of Corfu seeking to pressure Greece to pay reparations for the murder of an Italian general in Greece.
September 27
The Corfu incident ends; Italian troops withdraw after the Conference of Ambassadors rules in favor of Italian demands of reparations from Greece.
October 23–25
 The Hamburg Uprising occurs.
October 29
 Turkey officially becomes a Republic following the dissolution of the Ottoman Empire.
November 8
 The Beer Hall Putsch takes place, in which Adolf Hitler unsuccessfully leads the Nazis in an attempt to overthrow the German government. It is crushed by police the next day.

1924

January 21
 Leader of the Soviet Union Vladimir Lenin dies, and Joseph Stalin begins purging rivals to clear the way for his dictatorship.
February 1
 The United Kingdom extends diplomatic recognition to the Soviet Union.
March 16
 Italy annexes the Free State of Fiume.
April 1
 Adolf Hitler is sentenced to 5 years in prison for his participation in the Beer Hall Putsch (he serves only 8 months).
April 6
 Fascists win the 1924 Italian general election with a 2/3 majority.
June 10
  Italian Fascists kidnap and kill socialist leader Giacomo Matteotti in Rome.
August 16
 The Dawes Plan is accepted. It ends the Allied occupation of the Ruhr and sets a staggered payment plan for Germany's payment of war reparations.
August 18
 France begins withdrawing its troops from the Ruhr in Germany.

1925
May 12
Retired Field Marshal Paul Von Hindenburg is elected President of Germany.
July 18
 Hitler's autobiographical manifesto Mein Kampf is published.
December 1
The Locarno Treaties are signed in London (they are ratified September 14, 1926). The treaties settle the borders of western Europe and normalize relations between Germany and the Allied powers of western Europe.

1926
January 3
 Theodoros Pangalos declares himself dictator of Greece.
January 31
 British and Belgian troops leave Cologne, Germany.
April 4
 Greek dictator Theodoros Pangalos is elected president.
April 24
 The Treaty of Berlin is signed by Germany and the Soviet Union, which declares neutrality if either country is attacked within the next five years.
September 8
 Germany joins the League of Nations.
December 25
 Emperor Taishō dies, and is succeeded by his son Hirohito as the Emperor of Japan.

1927
April 12
The Shanghai massacre of 300-5,000 communists, perpetrated by the Kuomintang, marks the end of the First United Front and the beginning of the Chinese Civil War.
May 20
 Saudi Arabia and the United Kingdom sign the Treaty of Jeddah.
June 7
 Peter Voikov, Soviet ambassador to Warsaw, is assassinated by a White movement activist.
November 12
 Leon Trotsky is expelled from the Soviet Communist Party, leaving Joseph Stalin with undisputed control of the Soviet Union.
December 14
 Iraq gains independence from the United Kingdom.

1928
May 3
 The Jinan incident begins, a limited armed conflict between the Republic of China and Japan.
May 28
 Foundation of the Chinese Red Army.
June 4
 Huanggutun incident: Japanese agents assassinate the Chinese warlord Zhang Zuolin.
August 2
 Italy and Ethiopia sign the Italo-Ethiopian Treaty, pledging cooperation and friendship.
August 27
 The Kellogg–Briand Pact is signed in Paris by the major powers of the world. The treaty outlaws aggressive warfare.
October 1
The Soviet Union launches the first five-year plan, an economic effort to increase industrialization.
November 6
 Herbert Hoover wins the 1928 US president election defeating Al Smith.

1929
February 9
 Litvinov Protocol is signed in Moscow by the Soviet Union, Poland, Estonia, Romania, and Latvia. The Pact outlaws aggressive warfare along the lines of the Kellog-Briand Pact.
February 11
 Italy and the Holy See sign the Lateran Treaty, normalizing relations between the Vatican and Italy.
March 4
Herbert Hoover is inaugurated as President of the United States
March 28
 Japan withdraws troops from China, ending the Jinan incident.
April 3
 Persia signs Litvinov's Pact.
June 7
 The Lateran Treaty is ratified, making the Vatican City a sovereign state.
July 24
 The Kellogg–Briand Pact goes into effect.
August 31
 The Young Plan, which sets the total World War I reparations owed by Germany at US$26,350,000,000 to be paid over a period of 58½ years, is finalized. It replaces the earlier Dawes Plan.
October 29
 The Great Depression begins with the Wall Street Crash.

1930
April 22
 The United Kingdom, United States, France, Italy and Japan sign the London Naval Treaty regulating submarine warfare and limiting naval shipbuilding.
June 30
 France withdraws its remaining troops from the Rhineland ending the occupation of the Rhineland.
September 14
 German election results in the Nazis becoming the second-largest party in the Reichstag.

1931
May 19
 Launching of the first Deutschland-class cruiser, Deutschland. The construction of the ship causes consternation abroad as it was expected that the restriction of 10,000 tons displacement for these ships would limit the German Navy to coastal defense vessels, not ships capable of warfare on the open sea. 
September 18
 Mukden Incident: the Japanese stage a false flag bombing against a Japanese-owned railroad in the Chinese region of Manchuria, blaming Chinese dissidents for the attack, an incident that many claim is the official start of what would become the Second World War. 
September 19
 Using the Mukden Incident as a pretext, the Japanese invade Manchuria and set it up as a puppet state.

1932
 The Soviet famine of 1932–33, also known as the Holodomor begins, caused in part by the collectivization of agriculture of the first five-year plan.
January 7
 The Stimson Doctrine is proclaimed by United States Secretary of State Henry L. Stimson in response to Japan invading Manchuria. The Doctrine holds that the United States government will not recognize border changes that are made by force.
January 28
 January 28 incident: using a flare-up of anti-Japanese violence as a pretext, the Japanese attack Shanghai, China. Fighting ends on March 6, and on May 5 a ceasefire agreement is signed wherein Shanghai is made a demilitarized zone.
February 27
 Fighting between China and Japan in Manchuria ends with Japan in control of Manchuria.
March 1
 Japan creates the puppet state Manchukuo out of occupied Manchuria.
April 10
 Paul von Hindenburg is reelected President of Germany, defeating Adolf Hitler in a run-off.
May 4
The Soviet–Estonian Non-Aggression Pact is signed. It will enter into force on 18 August 1932 and will remain in force until 31 December 1945.
May 30
 Chancellor of Germany Heinrich Brüning resigns. President Hindenburg asks Franz von Papen to form a new government.
July 25
Soviet–Polish Non-Aggression Pact is signed with it being initially effective for three years.
August 30
 Hermann Göring is elected chairman of the German Senate.
November 8
 Franklin D. Roosevelt defeats Herbert Hoover in the 1932 presidential election. 
November 21
 President Hindenburg begins talking to Hitler about forming a new government.
December 3
 Hindenburg names Kurt von Schleicher Chancellor of Germany.

1933
January 1
Defense of the Great Wall: Japan attacks the fortified eastern end of the Great Wall of China in Rehe Province in Inner Mongolia.
January 30
 Hitler is appointed Chancellor of Germany by President Hindenburg.
February 27
 Germany's parliament building the Reichstag is set on fire.
February 28
 The Reichstag Fire Decree is passed, nullifying many German civil liberties.
March 4
 Franklin Delano Roosevelt is inaugurated as President of the United States.
March 20
 Germany's first concentration camp, Dachau, is completed.
March 23
 The Reichstag passes the Enabling Act, making Adolf Hitler dictator of Germany.
March 24
 Anti-Nazi boycott of 1933
March 27
 Japan leaves the League of Nations over the League of Nations' Lytton Report that found that Manchuria belongs to China and that Manchukuo was not a truly independent state.
April 1
 Germans are told to boycott Jewish shops and businesses.
April 26
 The Gestapo secret police is established in Germany.
May 2
 Hitler outlaws trade unions.
May 15 
 Official formation of the Luftwaffe, the German air force built in secret in violation of the Treaty of Versailles. 
May 31
 The Tanggu Truce is signed between China and Japan, setting the ceasefire conditions between the two states after the Japanese occupation of Manchuria. China accedes to all Japanese demands, creating a large demilitarized zone inside Chinese territory.
June 21
 All non-Nazi parties are banned in Germany.
July 14
 The Nazi party becomes the official party of Germany.
August 25
 Haavara Agreement: The agreement was designed to help facilitate the emigration of German Jews to Palestine.
September 2
 Italy and the USSR sign the Italo-Soviet Pact
September 12
 Leó Szilárd conceives the idea of the nuclear chain reaction.
October 19
 Germany leaves the League of Nations.
November 16
 The United States extends diplomatic recognition to the Soviet Union.
November 24
 Homeless, alcoholic, and unemployed sent to Nazi concentration camps.

1934

January 26
 Germany and Poland sign the 10 year German-Polish Non-Aggression Pact.
February 12–16
 The Austrian Civil War is fought, ending with Austrofascist victory.
February 9
 Balkan Pact, a military alliance is signed between Greece, Turkey, Romania and Yugoslavia
March 20
 All German police forces come under the command of Heinrich Himmler.
May 5
 Soviet–Polish Non-Aggresion Pact is extented to December 31, 1945.

June 30
 Night of the Long Knives in Germany. Potential rivals to Hitler within the Nazi Party, including SA leader Ernst Röhm and prominent anti-Nazi conservatives such as, former Chancellor Kurt von Schleicher, are killed by the SS and the Gestapo.
July 20
 The SS becomes an organization independent of the Nazi Party, reporting directly to Adolf Hitler.
July 25
 Austrian Nazis assassinate Engelbert Dollfuss during the failed July Putsch against the Austrian government.
August 2
 Upon the death of President Hindenburg, Hitler makes himself Führer of Germany, becoming Head of State as well as Chancellor.
August 8
 Members of the Wehrmacht begin swearing a personal oath of loyalty to Hitler instead of to the German constitution.
September
 The Soviet Union joins the League of Nations.
October 9
 King Alexander I of Yugoslavia and French foreign minister Louis Barthou are assassinated in Marseilles  Alexander's political murder further destablized the Balkans. Barthou and Alexander were working for peace in Europe, particularly between Germany and The Soviet, as they prepared each France and Yugoslavia for war.
October 16
Beginning of the Long March where the Chinese Red Army retreats to evade the pursuit of the Kuomintang forces.
December 1
Sergei Kirov, head of the Leningrad Communist Party, is murdered by an unknown assailant, precipitating a wave of repression in the Soviet Union. 
December 5
 The Abyssinia Crisis begins with the Walwal incident, an armed clash between Italian and Ethiopian troops on the border of Ethiopia.
December 29
 Japan renounces the Washington Naval Treaty and the London Naval Treaty.

1935
January 7
 The League of Nations approves the results of the Saar plebiscite, which allows Saar to be incorporated into German borders.
June 18
 The Anglo-German Naval Agreement is signed by Germany and the United Kingdom. The agreement allows Germany to build a fleet that's 35% the tonnage of the British fleet. In this way, the British hope to limit German naval rearmament.
August 31
 The Neutrality Act of 1935 is passed in the United States imposing a general embargo on trading in arms and war materials with all parties in a war and it also declared that American citizens traveling on ships of warring nations traveled at their own risk.
September 15
 The Reichstag passes the Nuremberg Laws, institutionalizing discrimination against Jews and providing the legal framework for the systematic persecution of Jews in Germany.
October 3
 Italy invades Ethiopia, beginning the Second Italo–Abyssinian War. League denounces Italy and calls for an oil embargo that fails.

November 14 
 Final British General election until 1945. Stanley Baldwin replaces Ramsay MacDonald as Prime Minister.

1936
January
 George V, King of the United Kingdom, is euthanized by his doctors. David, Prince of Wales becomes King Edward VIII. 
February 6
 Germany hosts the 1936 Winter Olympics in Garmisch-Partenkirchen, Bavaria.
March 7
 In violation of the Treaty of Versailles, Germany remilitarizes the Rhineland.
 After the Rhineland move Hitler met separately with French journalist Bertrand de Jouvenal and British analyst  Arnold J. Toynbee emphasizing his limited expansionist aim of building a greater German nation, and his desire for British understanding and cooperation.
King Edward VIII, over the head of the Baldwin Government, orders the military to stand down in relation to the move. 
March 25
 The Second London Naval Treaty is signed by the United Kingdom, United States, and France. Italy and Japan each declined to sign this treaty.
May 5
Italian troops march into the Ethiopian capital, Addis Ababa, marking the end of the Second Italo–Abyssinian War.
June 3
Luftwaffe Chief of Staff General Walther Wever loses his life in an air crash, ending any hope for the Luftwaffe to ever have a strategic bombing force similar to the Allies. 

July 17
 The failed Spanish coup of July 1936 by Nationalist forces marks the beginning of the Spanish Civil War.
August 1
 Germany hosts the 1936 Summer Olympics in Berlin.
October
The Great Purge commences in the Soviet Union with widespread repression of suspected opponents of the regime. The purge leads to the imprisonment and death of many military officers, weakening the Soviet Armed Forces ahead of World War II.
October 18
Göring is made head of the German Four Year Plan, an effort to make Germany self-sufficient through autarky and increase armaments.
November 3
Franklin D. Roosevelt wins reelection defeating Alf Landon.
November 14
 Suiyuan campaign begins as Japanese-backed Mongolian troops attack the Chinese garrison at Hongort.
November 15
 The aerial German Condor Legion goes into action for the first time in the Spanish Civil War in support of the Nationalist side.
November 25
 The Anti-Comintern Pact is signed by Japan and Germany. The signing parties agree to go to war with the Soviet Union if one of the signatories is attacked by the Soviet Union.
December 1
 Hitler makes it mandatory for all males between the ages 10-18 to join the Hitler Youth.
December 12
 Kuomintang marshal Zhang Xueliang kidnaps Chinese leader Chiang Kai-Shek in order to compel the Kuomintang to make a truce with the Chinese Communist party for the purpose of fighting the invading Japanese. 
Edward VIII is forced to abdicate due to his marriage to Wallis Simpson and is succeeded by Albert, Duke of York, who assumes the name King George VI
December 23
The first 3,000 men of the Italian expeditionary force (later named Corpo Truppe Volontarie) lands in Cadiz in support of the Nationalist side in the Spanish Civil War.
December 24
The Second United Front is formed between the Chinese Communist party and the Kuomintang, temporarily suspending the Chinese Civil War for the sake of fighting the Japanese.

1937
January 20
President Roosevelt begins his second term. 
February 21
The Non-Intervention Committee of the League of Nations prohibits foreign intervention or involvement in the Spanish Civil War.
May 7
The Condor Legion Fighter Group is deployed in Spain and begins to aid the Falangists.
May 28
Neville Chamberlain becomes Prime Minister of the United Kingdom.
June 21
Léon Blum's coalition government collapses.
July 7
 The Marco Polo Bridge Incident occurs, beginning the Second Sino-Japanese War.
August 8
 Japanese forces occupies the city of Beijing.
August 13
 Second Sino-Japanese War: Battle of Shanghai commences.
October 5
President Roosevelt gives the Quarantine Speech outlining a move away from neutrality and towards "quarantining" all aggressors.
October 13
Germany notifies Belgium that its sovereignty will be guaranteed as long as Belgium refrains from taking part in military action against Germany.
November 5
Adolf Hitler holds a  secret meeting in the Reich Chancellery and discusses the need for "lebensraum." 
November 6
Italy joins the Anti-Comintern Pact.
November 26
 Second Sino-Japanese War: Battle of Shanghai ends in Japanese victory as Chinese forces evacuate the city. 
December 1
 Second Sino-Japanese War: Battle of Nanking commences as Japanese forces attack the city. 
December 8
 Japan established the puppet state of Mengjiang in the Inner Mongolia region of the Republic of China.
December 11
 Italy leaves the League of Nations.
December 12
 The USS Panay incident occurs, where Japan attacked the American gunboat Panay while she was anchored in the Yangtze River.
December 13
 Second Sino-Japanese War: start of the Rape of Nanking following Japanese victory in the Battle of Nanking.

1938

January 26
 The Allison incident occurs further straining relations between Japan and the United States.
March 6
 Japanese troops reach the Vietnam River in Bucu aera in Vietnam.
March 13
 The Anschluss: Germany annexes Austria.
March 24
 Second Sino-Japanese War: Battle of Taierzhuang commences. The battle ends with Chinese victory on 7 April after intense house-to-house fighting inside the city of Taierzhuang.
 Second Sino-Japanese War: Battle of Xuzhou begins, and ends in Japanese victory on May 1 as Chinese troops break out from the encircled city. 
July 6–16
 Évian Conference: The United States and the United Kingdom refuse to accept any more Jewish refugees.
July 29
 The Soviet–Japanese border conflicts begin with the Battle of Lake Khasan.
August
 Soviet Union wins the Battle of Lake Khasan against Japan.
September 27
 U.S. President Roosevelt sends a letter to German Führer Adolf Hitler seeking peace.
September 30
 The Munich Agreement is signed by Germany, France, the United Kingdom, and Italy. The agreement allows Germany to annex the Czechoslovak Sudetenland area in exchange for peace in an attempt to appease Hitler. Related: .

October 5
Germany invalidates the passports of all its Jewish citizens who are reissued passports with the letter "J" stamped in red. This change was made after requests by Sweden and Switzerland who wanted a way of easily denying Jews entry into their countries.
November 7
Polish-German Jew Herschel Grynszpan murders moderate German consular aide Ernst vom Rath in Paris.
November 9
 vom Rath's death triggers Kristallnacht pogrom begins in Germany; thousands of Jewish shops and synagogues are smashed, looted, burned, and destroyed throughout the country.

1939

January 25
A uranium atom is split for the first time at Columbia University in the United States.
January 27
 Hitler orders Plan Z, a 5-year naval expansion programme intended to provide for a huge German fleet capable of defeating the British Royal Navy by 1944. The Kriegsmarine is given the first priority on the allotment of German economic resources. This is the first and only time the Kriegsmarine is given the first priority in the history of the Third Reich.
March 14
 The pro-German Slovak Republic is created.
 Carpatho-Ukraine is created, which Hungary invades that same day.
March 15
 Germany occupies and annexes Bohemia and Moravia-Silesia in violation of the Munich Agreement. The Czechs do not attempt to put up any organized resistance, having lost their main defensive line with the annexation of the Sudetenland.
 Germany establishes the Protectorate of Bohemia and Moravia. The Second Czechoslovak Republic is dissolved.
March 16
 Hungary annexes Carpatho-Ukraine.
March 20
 German Foreign Minister Joachim von Ribbentrop delivers an oral ultimatum to Lithuania, demanding that it cede the Klaipėda Region (German name Memel) to Germany.
March 21
 Hitler demands the return of the Free City of Danzig to Germany.
March 23
 German–Romanian Treaty for the Development of Economic Relations between the Two Countries is signed.
 Germany annexes the Klaipėda Region.
 Germany and Slovakia sign the Schutzzonenvertrag zwischen Deutschland und Slowakei [Treaty on the protective relationship between Germany and the Slovak State], creating the German Zone of Protection in Slovakia.
 The Slovak–Hungarian War begins.
March 31
 The United Kingdom and France offer a guarantee of Polish independence.
 The Slovak–Hungarian War ends.
April 1
 The Spanish Civil War ends in Nationalist victory. Spain becomes a dictatorship with Francisco Franco as the head of the new government.
April 3
 Hitler orders the German military to start planning for Fall Weiss, the codename for the attack on Poland, planned to be launched on August 25, 1939.
April 4
 Hungary and Slovakia sign the Budapest Treaty, handing over a strip of eastern Slovak territory to Hungary.
April 7–12
 Italy invades Albania with little in the way of military resistance. Albania is later made part of Italy through a personal union of the Italian and Albanian crown.
April 14
 U.S. President Roosevelt sends letter to German Chancellor Hitler and Italian Prime Minister Mussolini seeking peace.
April 18
 The Soviet Union proposes a tripartite alliance with the United Kingdom and France. It is rejected.
April 28
 In a speech before the Reichstag, Hitler renounces the Anglo-German Naval Agreement and the German–Polish declaration of non-aggression

May 11
 Soviet–Japanese border conflicts: The Battle of Khalkhin Gol begins with Japan and Manchukuo against the Soviet Union and Mongolia. The battle ends in Soviet victory on September 16, influencing the Japanese not to seek further conflict with the Soviets, but to turn towards the Pacific holdings of the Euro-American powers instead.
May 17
 Sweden, Norway, and Finland reject Germany's offer of non-aggression pacts.
May 22
 The Pact of Steel, known formally  as the "Pact of Friendship and Alliance between Germany and Italy", is signed by Fascist Italy and Nazi Germany. The Pact declares further cooperation between the two powers, but in a secret supplement the Pact is detailed as a military alliance.
June 7
 The German–Estonian and the German–Latvian non-aggression pacts are concluded. They will remain in force for ten years. 
June 14
 The Tientsin incident occurs, in which the Japanese blockade the British concession in the North China Treaty Port of Tientsin, now called Tianjin.
July 10
 Prime Minister Neville Chamberlain reaffirms support for Poland and makes it clear that Britain did not view Free City of Danzig as being an internal German-Polish affair and would intervene on behalf of Poland if hostilities broke out between the two countries.
August 2
 The Einstein-Szilárd letter is sent to President Roosevelt. Written by Leó Szilárd and signed by Albert Einstein, it warned of the danger that Germany might develop atomic bombs. This letter prompted action by Roosevelt and eventually resulted in the Manhattan Project.
August 23
 The Molotov–Ribbentrop Pact is signed between Nazi Germany and the Soviet Union, with secret provisions for the division of Eastern Europe – joint occupation of Poland and Soviet occupation of Estonia, Latvia and Lithuania, Finland and Bessarabia. This protocol removes the threat of Soviet intervention during the German invasion of Poland.
August 25
 In response to a message from Mussolini that Italy will not honor the Pact of Steel if Germany attacks Poland, Hitler delays the launch of the invasion by five days to provide more time to secure British and French neutrality.
August 30
 German ultimatum to Poland concerning the Polish Corridor and the Free City of Danzig.
September 1
 Without response to its ultimatum, Germany invades Poland, start of World War II (the Soviet Union invades Poland on September 17).

See also
 International relations (1919–1939)
 Causes of World War II
 Timeline of World War I
 Timeline of World War II
 Events preceding World War II in Europe
 Events preceding World War II in Asia

Notes and references

Further reading
 Thorne, Christopher G. The Approach of War, 1938-1939 (1969)  chronological table 1938-1939 pp 205-210

External links
 French Yellow Book
 Nazi-Soviet relations 1939-1941 
 Nazi-Soviet relations 1939-1941 (complete)
 British War Bluebook

20th-century timelines
Events preceding World War II
History of international relations
Interwar period
Modern history timelines

de:Chronologie Zweiter Weltkrieg#Vorgeschichte